The SS Arcadia Victory was a Victory ship built during World War II for cargo shipping. She was launched by the California Shipbuilding Company on 1 July 1944 and completed on 22 September 1944. The ship's United States Maritime Commission designation was VC2- S- AP3, hull number 41.

In 1961 she was rebuilt as a Denebola-class stores ship and renamed USNS Asterion (T-AF-63).  Her task was to carry stores, refrigerated items, and equipment to ships in the fleet, and to remote stations and staging areas.

War
Arcadia Victory served in both World War II and the Korean War as cargo ship.  Arcadia Victory steamed the Mediterranean Sea taking ammunition and supplies to US troops at Crete, Rhodes, Turkey and Egypt in a convoy. Arcadia Victory was hit by a torpedo in her bow. Her water tight bulkheads were closed, so she stayed afloat. The Arcadia Victorys bow hold had spare engine parts, so the ammunition in the other holds did not exploded. Her crew was rescued and Arcadia Victory was beached off shore.

Pre-recommissioning activity
The second vessel to be named Asterion by the US Navy, AF-63 was laid down under a United States Maritime Commission contract (MCV hull 41) on 10 June 1944 at Los Angeles, California, by the California Shipbuilding Corporation., as Arcadia Victory. Launched on 27 July 1944 and sponsored by Mrs. James T. Wishart, Arcadia Victory was delivered to her operators, the American President Lines (APL), on 3 September 1944. She operated under the APL shipping line's flag until laid up late in 1952.

Acquired by the Navy
Removed from the National Defense Reserve Fleet berthing area at Suisun Bay, California, on 7 November 1961, Arcadia Victory was acquired by the US Navy from the United States Maritime Commissionon 12 November 1961. Renamed Asterion and classified as a store ship, AF-63, on 4 December 1961, the ship was taken to the Willamette Iron and Steel Company. of Portland, Oregon, where she underwent conversion to a refrigerated stores ship.

Assigned to MSTS
Placed in service with the US Navy's Military Sea Transportation Service, (MSTS) (later Military Sealift Command, (MSC) in September 1962 as USNS Asterion (T-AF-63), the ship operated in the MSTS (later, MSC), Pacific Area, delivering fresh and frozen foods to Pacific and Far Eastern ports. On 5 June 1963, Asterion suffered minor damage to her bow in a collision off San Francisco, California, with the Japanese freighter MV Kokoku Maru. The USCGC Magnolia (WLB-328) from US Coast Guard Base Yerba Buena Island San Francisco California responded to the vessels distress calls and provided assistance for both ships. The MV Kokoku Maru sustained heavy damage, and the USCGC Magnolia (WLB-328) evacuated 19 her crew to San Francisco California.

Carrying "everything from steak and spuds, to mobile cranes and dynamite," Asterion; the winner of the MSTS "Smart Ship Award" in 1967, operated in the Pacific Ocean for the next decade; her ports of call ranged from Settahip, Thailand, and Saigon, South Vietnam, to Seattle, Washington, San Francisco, and Yokohama. As American involvement in the Vietnam War grew, Asterion's itinerary included the ports of Qui Nhon, Cam Ranh Bay, and Danang.

DecommissioningAsterion''''' arrived at Yokohama on 8 June 1973 from her last voyage as a "reefer ship" and her name was struck from the Navy list on 15 June 1973. Transferred, at Yokohama Japan, to the Maritime Administration for disposal, she was sold to N. W. Kennedy, Ltd., of Vancouver, British Columbia, Canada, on 31 August 1973. Resold to Far Eastern shipbreakers for scrapping in 1973.

See also
List of United States Navy ships
Cargo ship
List of Victory ships
 Liberty ship
 Type C1 ship
 Type C2 ship
 Type C3 ship

References

US Department of Homeland Security. United States Coast Guard Historian's Office.
http://www.uscg.mil/history/

External links

  NavSource Online: Service Ship Photo Archive – T-AF-63 Asterion

Victory ships
Ships built in Los Angeles
1944 ships
World War II merchant ships of the United States
Stores ships of the United States Navy
Vietnam War auxiliary ships of the United States